Ron Stephens may refer to:

 Ron Stephens (Illinois politician) (born 1948), member of the Illinois House of Representatives
 Ron Stephens (Georgia politician) (born 1954), member of the Georgia House of Representatives